The 1970 UTEP Miners football team was an American football team that represented the University of Texas at El Paso as a member of the Western Athletic Conference (WAC) during the 1970 NCAA University Division football season. In its sixth season under head coach Bobby Dobbs, the team compiled a 6–4 record (4–3 against WAC opponents), finished fourth in the conference, and outscored opponents by a total of 258 to 236.

Schedule

References

UTEP
UTEP Miners football seasons
UTEP Miners football